The Real Housewives Ultimate Girls Trip (acronym RHUGT) is an American reality television series that premiered on Peacock on November 16, 2021. The series follows several women from The Real Housewives franchise as they vacation together.

Overview and casting 
In September 2019, it was announced an untitled The Real Housewives franchise spin-off was in development at Peacock. In February 2021, it was announced Peacock had greenlit a limited series following multiple women from different Housewives installments living together for a period of time.

Series synopsis 
The first season was filmed at the Triton Luxury Villa in Turks and Caicos Islands and features Cynthia Bailey, Luann de Lesseps, Teresa Giudice, Melissa Gorga, Kenya Moore, Kyle Richards, and Ramona Singer. Vicki Gunvalson and Gizelle Bryant both stated they were initially cast for the first season, but were unable to commit to the project due to the COVID-19 pandemic. Principal photography began in April 2021. The first season premiered on November 16, 2021.

The second season was filmed in September 2021 at Dorinda Medley's Blue Stone Manor located in Great Barrington, Massachusetts. Officially titled Real Housewives Ultimate Girls Trip Ex-Wives Club, the second season features former Housewives stars who are no longer cast-members on their original series. The cast consists of Taylor Armstrong, Brandi Glanville, Gunvalson, Tamra Judge, Eva Marcille, Medley, Phaedra Parks and Jill Zarin. The second season premiered on June 23, 2022.

Production on the third season began on July 18, 2022, in Thailand. The cast will include Bryant, Candiace Dillard Bassett, Heather Gay, Leah McSweeney, Alexia Nepola, Marysol Patton, Whitney Rose and Porsha Williams. Tinsley Mortimer was initially cast for the season but was replaced by Williams, citing "personal reasons" for her decision to exit. It is scheduled to premiere on March 23, 2023.

On January 9, 2023, Bravo announced the fourth season would take place in Marrakesh, Morocco. The cast will include returning housewives Glanville, Gunvalson, Marcille and Parks; Camille Grammer, Caroline Manzo, Alex McCord and Gretchen Rossi will join as new additions.

List of cast members

Episodes

Series overview

Season 1 (2021)

Season 2 (2022)

Season 3 (2023)

References

2020s American reality television series
2021 American television series debuts
American television spin-offs
Reality television spin-offs
Ultimate Girls Trip
Peacock (streaming service) original programming
English-language television shows
Television shows filmed in the Turks and Caicos Islands
Television shows filmed in Massachusetts
Television shows filmed in Thailand